The Nirajul Mic (Hungarian pronunciation: , meaning Small Poplar) is the left headwater of the river Niraj in Transylvania, Romania. It joins the Nirajul Mare in the village of Câmpu Cetății to form the Niraj.

This river should not be confused with the Nirajul Mic, having the same name, but joining the Niraj near the city of Miercurea Nirajului

References

Rivers of Romania
Rivers of Mureș County